Direktflyg, officially Svenska Direktflyg AB, was a regional airline based in Stockholm, Sweden which operated services to seven domestic destinations. The company also served as an aircraft lessor, through its subsidiary Largus Aviation.

History 
The airline was formed in 2000, to bring together Skyway Holding's regional carriers, Air Express, Highland Air and Airborne, into one consolidated operation, and started operations in October 2000.

Airborne began in 1984 when it was known as Sundsvall Aero. 

Highland Air began in September 1995 and was acquired by Skyways in March 1997.

Air Express was founded in 1986 and was purchased by Skyways from major shareholder Thomas Sjö in 1999. In April 2002 the airline rebranded as Direktflyg following acquisition by the Largus-Group. On 22 May 2012, parent company Skyways Express AB and sister airline City Airline AB filed for bankruptcy.

As of January 2015, Direktflyg ceased to operate with its own fleet. Services have been transferred to AIS Airlines and rebranded accordingly. AIS Airlines had already served as a major codeshare operator for Direktflyg. From 1/7 2018 Amapola flyg are flying to the north parts of Sweden following the bankrubcy of Nextjet.

In December 2019, the airline was merged into Amapola Flyg.

Destinations 
Direktflyg operated to the following destinations:

Fleet 

As of December 2015 Direktflyg had no fleet. The aircraft from AIS Airlines include the following:

See also
 Airlines
 Transport in Sweden

References

External links

Official website

Defunct airlines of Sweden
Airlines established in 2000
Airlines disestablished in 2019